Monte Salmone is a mountain of the Lepontine Alps, located north of Cavigliano in the canton of Ticino. It lies on the range between the valleys of Onsernone and Maggia.

References

External links
 Monte Salmone on Hikr

Mountains of the Alps
Mountains of Ticino
Lepontine Alps
Salmone
Mountains of Switzerland